The Face is a fictional character, a comic book superhero that appeared in 1940s comics during what historians and fans call the Golden Age of Comic Books. He was created by  artist Mart Bailey and an unknown writer.

The Face is radio announcer Tony Trent, who decides to fight crime after having witnessed a murder committed by gangsters disguised as cops. Having no innate superpowers, he instead uses a grotesque green mask to scare criminals, not unlike Batman. With issue #63, he no longer wears the mask and fights crime as himself.

Publication history

The Face first appeared in the Columbia Comics omnibus title Big Shot Comics #1 (May 1940) and continued until issue #62 (January 1946). By 1947, the shock value had worn off. From issue #63 the feature continued as "Tony Trent" until Big Shot #104, the final issue of the series. Apart from appearing in Big Shot, The Face also had two issues of his own title (1941-1942), as well as two as Tony Trent (1948).

Originally created by Mart Bailey, the character wore a frightening green mask, with flaming red hair, a vampire's white fangs and ghoulish yellow eyes. Underneath the mask was a deep blue tuxedo, which gave him more class. His alter ego was Tony Trent. Tony's outgoing personality made him perfect for his job at a broadcasting station.

According to Jess Nevins' Encyclopedia of Golden Age Superheroes, "The Face fights ordinary criminals, gold-makers, the Hook, and even the Japanese when the Face frees the Flying Tigers from a Japanese ship".

In the 1980s, new stories were published by Ron Frantz' Ace Comics. Three issues of What Is... The Face? were published.

After the Face passed into the public domain, a character heavily based on him, called Mr. Face, was introduced for the 2008 limited series Project Superpowers, published by Dynamite Entertainment.

Project Superpowers
At some point after World War II, The Fighting Yank persuades Trent to don his mask just one more time, immediately after which the Yank traps him in the mystical Urn of Pandora, as part of a misguided quest to end all evil on Earth. Decades later, the Urn is broken and all the prisoners are freed, although some of them are now changed. The Face discovers that anyone who looks at his masked face now experiences hallucinations of whatever they fear most.

Powers and abilities
The Face has no superpowers, usually relying on his masked appearance to scare his opponents. Later he developed an expertise in unarmed combat, and was an excellent marksman with a mastery with most weapons as well as being an expert swordsman.

Mr. Face has the ability to make his opponents experience their worst fears while looking at his masked face.

References

American comics titles
Comics characters introduced in 1940
Dynamite Entertainment characters
Fictional swordfighters in comics
Golden Age superheroes
Vigilante characters in comics